The list of headmasters of St. Bees School includes the men and one woman who have held the headmastership of St. Bees School in west Cumbria (formerly the county of Cumberland).  Under the statutes drawn up by the school's founder, Archbishop Edmund Grindal, the headmaster of the school was chosen by the Provost of the Queen's College, Oxford.  This state of affairs lasted until 1879 when a "new scheme" came into place and the board of governors had a greater say in the appointment.

In the early days of the school the headmaster was the sole master, his school being a one-story stone building (now the school's main dining room).  In the nineteenth century, St. Bees School began to expand thanks to the proceeds from mineral royalties, legally won in part by the efforts of Headmaster William Wilson, and in 1844 the headmaster moved into the newly built south wing of the "Quad", the quadrangle of sandstone buildings which makes up the main and oldest part of the school.  In 1886, a purpose built home was constructed called the "School House", part of which today serves as a senior boys' boarding house.

List of headmasters at St. Bees School

Notes

Bibliography
 

St Bees School
Saint Bees School, Headmasters
Saint Bees School, Headmasters